Róbert Fazekas (born 18 August 1975 in Szombathely) is a Hungarian discus thrower, who won gold in the 2002 European Championships and silver in the 2003 World Championship. He finished first in the 2004 Summer Olympics, but was later disqualified for failing to provide a drug sample, and the gold medal was awarded to Virgilijus Alekna. Fazekas ranks seventh in all-time longest discus throw distances with a personal best of 71.70m.

2004 Athens - Olympic Games 

After the final, Fazekas provided only 25 millilitres of urine (50 ml short of the minimum amount required), stating he was "in an unstable psychological state and feeling unwell". Observers from the International Olympic Committee warned that this would constitute a doping infraction and advised that he could go with them to the clinic at the Olympic Village, where he could provide a further sample. Fazekas refused the offer. A delegation in his defence stated that he was a deeply religious person who frequently had difficulty producing a sample when under observation. The IOC rejected this and disqualified him from the Olympics.

2008 Beijing - Olympic Games 

After two years ban from international competitions, Fazekas made a relatively good comeback by finishing in eighth position in the discus at the Beijing Olympics.

Preparation for 2012 London - Olympic Games 

Two days before the 2012 Summer Olympics Fazekas failed a drugs test, stanazolol has been identified. However officially he was not named but had been eliminated from the Olympic Team. One week later, his B sample was also tested positive, after he openly recognized his test had been failed. Initially he was suspended by the IAAF from athletics competition for 8 years, finally on trial by the Hungarian Anti-Doping Committee on 2 October 2012, the committee's decision declared that Róbert Fazekas did not use any banned performance-enhancing drugs deliberately. Exiguous amount of stanozolol was found in his system by neglect, therefore his first degree sentence was overruled and reduced to a 6-year suspension from competition. In the committee's explanation of their verdict: Róbert Fazekas has proved dependably that his system was exposed by stanozolol by taking a nutritional supplement that is legally available in retail stores. Samples from the exact bottle of the supplement, taken by Róbert Fazekas, and from a randomly bought, sealed bottle of the same brand of supplement were tested in an Austrian accredited laboratory by the Hungarian Anti-Doping Group. The A and the B test from the samples of both the opened and the sealed bottles resulted the same level of stanazolol. The containment of the steroid was not identified the nutritional supplement's ingredients.

Struggle for 2016 Rio de Janeiro - Olympic Games 

Meanwhile, in June 2013 Fazekas won the IHGF World Amateur Highland Games Championships in Furstenwalde, Germany. In 2013 he filed a lawsuit against the Canadian company producing the nutritional supplement. As a result of another trial on a civil court started in 2012, his suspension was reduced to 3 years, thus it has been already expired in 2015. Despite he could not compete since the Hungarian Athletics Association disputed the authority of the Hungarian Court arguing a civil court's final decision is not obligatory for the IAAF, thus they appealed to the  Supreme Court for the revision and the cession of the execution of the decision, though the Hungarian Anti-Doping Group reinstated Fazekas to their controlling program that is the first step to be able to have a permission for legal competition.

The Hungarian Athletics Association decided not to grant any permission until having the IAAF's official statement. Fazekas asked an accelerated procedure due to 2016 Olympic Games in Rio de Janeiro. Finally the Supreme Court repealed the original sentence explaining the case of doping was a fact, the result of the tests were not debated by the athlete, however not the case of deliberation but only the case negligence holds, nevertheless because of the principle of the zero tolerance the 6-year suspension still remains in action.

Since the WADA's regulation regarding negligence had been moderated Fazekas made an appeal earlier again for decreasing his suspension, the leader of the Hungarian Anti-Doping Group stated in may be only applied until after the legal procedure, thus Fazekas made its appeal again to reduce the earlier suspension to 4 years, so he could be able to compete from 6 July 2016. Finally he summarized: "Despite of the happennings I don't have in mind to finish my career, I feel still enough power in me. Nevertheless, I resigned on the Olympic Games. The events of the past month tried me as much I was not able to prepare properly for such an important event".

Achievements

Awards
 Hungarian athlete of the Year (1): 2002

References

External links
 
 

1975 births
Living people
Sportspeople from Szombathely
Hungarian male discus throwers
Hungarian sportspeople in doping cases
Athletes (track and field) at the 2004 Summer Olympics
Athletes (track and field) at the 2008 Summer Olympics
Olympic athletes of Hungary
Doping cases in athletics
Competitors stripped of Summer Olympics medals
World Athletics Championships medalists
European Athletics Championships medalists